Carlos may refer to:

Places

Canada
 Carlos, Alberta, a locality

United States
 Carlos, Indiana, an unincorporated community
 Carlos, Maryland, a place in Allegany County
 Carlos, Minnesota, a small city
 Carlos, West Virginia

Elsewhere
 Carlos (crater), Montes Apenninus, LQ12, Moon; a lunar crater near Mons Hadley

People
 Carlos (given name), including a list of name holders
 Carlos (surname), including a list of name holders

Sportspeople
 Carlos (Timorese footballer) (born 1986)
 Carlos (footballer, born 1995), Brazilian footballer
 Carlos (footballer, born 1985), Brazilian footballer

Others
 Carlos (Calusa) (died 1567), king or paramount chief of the Calusa people of Southwest Florida
 Carlos (DJ) (born 1966), British DJ
 Carlos (singer) (1943—2008), French entertainer
 Carlos the Jackal, a Venezuelan terrorist

Arts and entertainment
 Carlos (miniseries), 2010 biopic about the terrorist Carlos the Jackal
 Carlos (film), 1971 film based on Don Carlos
 Carlos (album), 2000 album by Carlos Toshiki

Other uses
 Carlos (cycling team), Belgian pro cycling team

See also

Karlos (name)
Carlo (disambiguation)
Don Carlos (disambiguation)